Rahel Michielin (born 11 October 1990 in Frauenfeld, Switzerland) is a Swiss ice hockey forward.

International career
Michielin was selected for the Switzerland national women's ice hockey team in the 2010 Winter Olympics. She played in all five games, though she did not score a point.

Michielin has also appeared for Switzerland at four IIHF Women's World Championships. Her first appearance came in 2008. She was a member of the bronze medal winning team at the 2012 championships.

Michielin made one appearance for the Switzerland women's national under-18 ice hockey team, at the 2008 IIHF World Women's U18 Championship.

Career statistics

International career

References

External links
Eurohockey.com Profile
Sports-Reference Profile

1990 births
Living people
Ice hockey players at the 2010 Winter Olympics
Olympic ice hockey players of Switzerland
People from Frauenfeld
Swiss women's ice hockey forwards
Sportspeople from Thurgau